Mabuasehube Game Reserve is a park in Botswana. In 1992 it was incorporated into Botswana's Gemsbok National Park, and in 2000 it became part of the Kgalagadi Transfrontier Park.

References

Parks in Botswana